Kosmos 400 ( meaning Cosmos 400), also known as DS-P1-M No.3 was a satellite which was used as a target for tests of anti-satellite weapons. It was launched by the Soviet Union in 1971 as part of the Dnepropetrovsk Sputnik programme, and used as a target for Kosmos 404, as part of the Istrebitel Sputnikov programme.

Launch 
It was launched aboard a Kosmos-3M carrier rocket, from Site 132/1 at the Plesetsk Cosmodrome. The launch occurred at 21:45:00 UTC on 18 March 1971.

Orbit 
It was successfully intercepted and destroyed by Kosmos 404 on 4 April. As of 2009, debris is still in orbit.

Kosmos 400 was the third of the five original DS-P1-M satellites to be launched, of which all but the first were successful. Following the five initial launches the DS-P1-M satellite was replaced with a derivative, Lira.

See also

 1971 in spaceflight

References

1971 in spaceflight
1971 in the Soviet Union
Intentionally destroyed artificial satellites
Kosmos satellites
Spacecraft launched in 1971
Dnepropetrovsk Sputnik program